Kendall Peak is a mountain located on the county line separating King County and Kittitas County of Washington state. It is within the Alpine Lakes Wilderness on the crest of the Cascade Range. Kendall Peak is situated two miles northeast of Snoqualmie Pass on land managed by Mount Baker-Snoqualmie National Forest. Precipitation runoff on the east side of the mountain drains into Silver Creek and makes its way to the Columbia River via Yakima River, whereas the west side of the mountain drains into the South Fork Snoqualmie River via Commonwealth Creek. The Pacific Crest Trail traverses its west flank and an exposed section of the trail called Kendall Katwalk has seen tragic deaths over the years, most recently September 5, 2018. The nearest higher peak is Red Mountain,  to the north-northwest.

Climate

Kendall Peak is located in the marine west coast climate zone of western North America. Most weather fronts originate in the Pacific Ocean, and travel northeast toward the Cascade Mountains. As fronts approach, they are forced upward by the peaks of the Cascade Range, causing them to drop their moisture in the form of rain or snowfall onto the Cascades (Orographic lift). As a result, the west side of the Cascades experiences high precipitation, especially during the winter months in the form of snowfall. During winter months, weather is usually cloudy, but, due to high pressure systems over the Pacific Ocean that intensify during summer months, there is often little or no cloud cover during the summer. Because of maritime influence, snow tends to be wet and heavy, resulting in high avalanche danger.

Geology
The Cascades feature rugged topography with craggy peaks, ridges, and deep glacial valleys. Geological events occurring many years ago created the diverse topography and drastic elevation changes over the Cascade Range leading to the various climate differences. These climate differences lead to vegetation variety defining the ecoregions in this area. The history of the formation of the Cascade Mountains dates back millions of years ago to the late Eocene Epoch. With the North American Plate overriding the Pacific Plate, episodes of volcanic igneous activity persisted. During the Pleistocene period dating back over two million years ago, glaciation advancing and retreating repeatedly scoured the landscape leaving deposits of rock debris. The "U"-shaped cross section of the river valleys are a result of recent glaciation. Uplift and faulting in combination with glaciation have been the dominant processes which have created the tall peaks and deep valleys.

See also
List of peaks of the Alpine Lakes Wilderness

References

External links
 Weather forecast: Kendall Peak
Alpine Lakes Wilderness (Mt. Baker-Snoqualmie National Forest) U.S. Forest Service

Mountains of Washington (state)
Mountains of King County, Washington
Mountains of Kittitas County, Washington
Cascade Range
Mount Baker-Snoqualmie National Forest
North American 1000 m summits